Homicide Studies is a peer-reviewed academic journal covering the study of homicide. The editor-in-chief is Jesenia Pizarro (Arizona State University). It was established in 1997 and is currently published by SAGE Publications.

Abstracting and indexing 
Homicide Studies is abstracted and indexed in Scopus and the Social Sciences Citation Index. According to the Journal Citation Reports, its 2020 impact factor is 1.63, ranking it 30 out of 50 journals in the category "Criminology and Penology".

References

External links 
 

SAGE Publishing academic journals
English-language journals
Criminology journals
Quarterly journals
Publications established in 1979